Kharaharapriya is a rāga in Carnatic music. It is the 22nd melakarta rāga (parent scale) in the 72 melakarta rāga system. It is possible that the name of the ragam was originally Harapriya but it was changed to conform to the Katapayadi formula. Kharaharapriya has a distinct melody and brings out the Karuna rasam, invoking pathos in the listeners. The Kafi thaat of Hindustani music is the equivalent of Kharaharapriya. Its Western equivalent is the Dorian mode.

Etymology 
There are many theories behind the etymology of the name Kharaharapriya. One of the most popular beliefs is that the ragam was initially called Samaganam and when Ravana was trapped by Shiva, under the kailash hill trying to lift it, it is believed that, to appease the lord, Ravana sang many hymns in praise of the lord, but his heart cooled only when a hymn was sung in the ragam and hence the name (hara) shiva and (priya) loved hence "Harapriya " – The one dear to Shiva, and to fit it in the Katapayadi system according to the melakarta chakra system.

The word Kharaharapriya may also mean the beloved of the killer of the Khara demon (Khara – Khara demon, Hara – Defeater/Killer, Priya – Beloved). The story of Rama killing the Khara demon is narrated in the 28th, 29th and the 30th sub-chapter of the Aranya Khanda of Ramayana. It could be speculated that this was a reason why Saint Tyagaraja revived this dying ancient raga in the 18th century and breathed new life into it by creating many compositions in this raga.

Structure and Lakshana 

It is 4th rāga in the 4th chakra Veda. The mnemonic name is Veda-Bhu. The mnemonic phrase is sa ri gi ma pa dhi ni. Its  structure is as follows (see swaras in Carnatic music for details on below notation and terms):
 : 
 : 

The notes are chatushruti rishabham, sadharana gandharam, shuddha madhyamam, chatushruti dhaivatam and kaisiki Nishadam. It is a sampoorna rāgam – scale having all 7 swarams. It is the shuddha madhyamam equivalent of Hemavati, which is the 58th melakarta scale. Since the swaras of Kharaharapriya are quite evenly spaced, and since several different types of gamakas are allowed, it is a very versatile, fluid and flexible rāgam that allows for elaborate melodic improvisation within its scale.

Songs sung in Kharaharapriya ragas typically have long, elaborate ālapanās, which exhibit the fluidity of the rāgam. Kharaharapriya songs are usually meant to be sung slow, medium or medium-fast, in order to bring out the Karuna rasa and bhava of the song.

Janya rāgams 
Due to the even spacing of swaras, many [janya] rāgams (derived scales) are associated with Kharaharapriya. It is one of the melakarta scales that has a large number of janya rāgams. Many of the janya rāgams are very popular on their own, lending themselves to elaboration and interpretation. Some of them are Abheri, Abhogi,Andolika, Bhimplaas (Hindustani music), Brindavana Saranga, Kāpi, Madhyamavati, Mukhari, Reetigowla, Shree, Dhanashree, Udayaravichandrika, and Sriranjani.

See List of janya rāgams for full list of scales associated with Kharaharapriya.

Compositions 

Kharaharapriya has been decorated with compositions by many composers. The ragam is most closely associated with Thyagaraja who has pioneered in composing many songs in this rāgam, that have become popular and well known. Both Muthuswami Dikshitar and Shyama Sastri, however, have not composed kritis in 'Kharaharapriya' A few of the popular compositions are listed here.

Chakkani Rājamārgamu, Pakkala Nilabaḍi, Mitri Bhāgyame, Rāmā nī samānamevaru, Naḍaci Naḍaci,Peridi ninnu, Chetulāra shrungāramu, Kori sevimpa rāre, Pāhi rāma rāma anuchu, Vidamu sevayave, and Rāma nīyada by saint Tyagaraja in Telugu language
Satatam thaavaka pada sevanam, by Swathi Thirunal
Sundara Natarajam by Oothukadu Venkata Kavi in Sanskrit
Moovasai konda thirumal by Muthiah Bhagavatar in Tamil
Senthil andavan, Srinivasa Tava Charanam, Janaki pathe, Appan Avatharitha Kathamritham and Ganapathiye Karunanidhiye by Papanasam Sivan in Tamil
Karunajalarase rama, by K. C. Kesava Pillai in Malayalam
Hariyennu Hariyennu By Purandara Dasaru
 Bharathi deviya nene by Purandara Dasa in Kannada and Okkaparikokkapari and Nityapujalivigo by Annamacharya in Telugu have now been tuned in Kharaharapiya since the original tunes have been lost forever.
 Nama Rasa Manave by Kalyani Varadarajan
 Varnam - Vevela Velpulalo (Janaka Raga Varna Manjari) by Nallan Chakravarthy Murthy 

The basic scale of Kharaharapriya has been used in several film songs in Indian film music. Although rarely authentic, there are several film songs that are set in this scale, or scales derived from this ragam. The popular Kannada song 'Arādhisuve madanāri', from the movie Babhruvahana (1977) and sung by Dr. Rajkumar, is in typical Kharaharapriya. A popular Tamil film composer M.S.Viswanathan used this raga brilliantly in many of his songs such as "Maharajan Ullagai" from Karnan, "Maadhavi Ponmayilal" in the movie Iru malargal. Ace singer P. Unnikrishnan released his 2012 album on Lord Ayyappan titled Shabaimalai Va Charanam Solli Va in which he has rendered a song in Kharaharapriya raagam set in classical melody. The song also illustrates how the Lord learnt the Kalari fight in Cheerappanchira which houses a temple called Mukkal Vattam managed by Lord's Guruvamsam even now.

Film Songs

Language:Tamil

Janya 1:Ragam Karnaranjani Tamil 
Ascending:S R2 G2 M1 G2 P D2 S

Descending:S N2 D2 P M1 G2 R2 S

The Hindi song 'Tumhen Dekhti Hoon To' from movie Tumhare Liye composed by Jaidev sung by Lata Mangeshkar was based on Ragam Karnaranjani too.

Related rāgams 

This section covers the theoretical and scientific aspect of this rāgam.

Kharaharapriya's notes when shifted using Graha bhedam, yields 5 other major melakarta rāgams, namely, Kalyani, Hanumatodi, Natabhairavi, Shankarabharanam and Harikambhoji. For further details and an illustration of Graha bhedam of this rāgam refer Graha bhedam on Shankarabharanam.

Notes

References 

Melakarta ragas